Terellia nigronota is a species of tephritid or fruit flies in the genus Terellia of the family Tephritidae.

Distribution
Russia, Georgia, Armenia.

References

Tephritinae
Insects described in 1985
Diptera of Europe